Deinococcus saxicola is a species of low temperature and drought-tolerating, UV-resistant bacteria from Antarctica. It is Gram-positive, non-motile and coccoid-shaped. Its type strain is AA-1444T (DSM 15974T).

References

Further reading
Bej, Asim K., Jackie Aislabie, and Ronald M. Atlas, eds. Polar microbiology: the ecology, biodiversity and bioremediation potential of microorganisms in extremely cold environments. CRC Press, 2009. 
Staley, James T., et al. "Bergey's manual of systematic bacteriology, vol. 3."Williams and Wilkins, Baltimore, MD (1989): 2250–2251.

External links

LPSN
Type strain of Deinococcus saxicola at BacDive -  the Bacterial Diversity Metadatabase

Polyextremophiles
Deinococcales
Bacteria described in 2006